Yevhen Anatoliyovych Lysytsyn (born 16 July 1981) is a former Ukrainian professional footballer.

Club career
He made his debut in the Russian Premier League in 2001 for FC Spartak Moscow.

Honours
 Russian Premier League champion: 2001.

References

1981 births
Footballers from Luhansk
Living people
Association football midfielders
Ukrainian footballers
FC Hirnyk Rovenky players
FC Shakhtar Luhansk players
FC Spartak Moscow players
FC Fakel Voronezh players
FC Akhmat Grozny players
FC Stal Kamianske players
FC Stal Alchevsk players
FC Hoverla Uzhhorod players
MFC Mykolaiv players
FC Helios Kharkiv players
Ukrainian First League players
Russian Premier League players
Ukrainian Premier League players
Ukrainian expatriate footballers
Expatriate footballers in Russia